The Legendary Prestige Quintet Sessions is a four compact disc box set of recordings by the Miles Davis Quintet released in 2006 by the Concord Music Group. It collates on three discs the entire set of recordings that made up the Prestige Records albums released from 1956 through 1961 — Miles, Cookin', Relaxin', Workin', and Steamin'. The track "'Round Midnight" was released on the album Miles Davis and the Modern Jazz Giants. The fourth disc contains live material from a television broadcast and in jazz club settings. It peaked at #15 on the Billboard jazz album chart, and was reissued on December 2, 2016, in a smaller compact disc brick packaging.

In 2019 Craft Recordings, an imprint of the Concord group of labels, released a 32-track version without the fourth disc of live recordings subsequent to the main body of studio recordings in digital hi-res format. It is also available in a set of six vinyl LPs from Craft Recordings in the original 42-track format.

Background
In the summer of 1955, Davis performed a noted set at the Newport Jazz Festival, and had been approached by Columbia Records executive George Avakian, offering a contract with the label if he could form a regular band. Davis assembled his first regular quintet to meet a commitment at the Café Bohemia in July with Sonny Rollins on tenor saxophone, Red Garland on piano, Paul Chambers on bass, and Philly Joe Jones on drums. By the autumn Rollins had left, and at the recommendation of Jones, Davis replaced Rollins with John Coltrane.

In January 1951, Prestige Records owner and producer Bob Weinstock signed Davis to a one-year contract; Davis would continue to record for the label into 1956. Weinstock gave Davis an advance of $750, but the company's artists' contracts were often manipulative with low royalties, paying nothing for rehearsal time. With his success at Newport and the formation of the Miles Davis Quintet, Davis convinced Avakian to buy out his contract with Prestige.

The terms of the deal between Avakian and Weinstock allowed Davis to record for Columbia but not release any of the material until Davis fulfilled his remaining duty to Prestige. Davis took the quintet into the studio for three marathon dates over a one-year period, meeting his contractual obligations efficiently. Prestige released the results of the first date for the album Miles in 1956, his second specifically for the twelve-inch LP format.

Content
Recording sessions took place at the studio of Rudy Van Gelder in Hackensack, New Jersey, on one date in 1955 and two in 1956. Discs one, two, and three contain selections in the order they were taped, all five Prestige LPs assembled from this material. The songs were mostly pop standards, mixed with jazz standards that would have been commonly played by hard bop groups during the 1950s. Disc one, tracks one through six, were recorded on November 16, 1955; disc one, tracks seven through ten, and disc two, tracks one through ten, were recorded on May 11, 1956; and disc two, tracks eleven and twelve, and disc three were recorded on October 26, 1956. 

Disc four contains previously unreleased live performances. Tracks one through four are from the first iteration of The Tonight Show, taped on November 17, 1955, the day after the first studio session. Tracks five and six derive from a radio broadcast at the now-defunct Blue Note club in Philadelphia on December 8, 1956. Tracks seven through ten derive from a show at the also defunct Café Bohemia in New York City on May 17, 1958, with Bill Evans in place of Garland. The show was broadcast on the Bandstand USA radio program.

Track listing

Disc one

Disc two

Disc three

Disc four

Personnel
 Miles Davis — trumpet
 John Coltrane — tenor saxophone
 Red Garland — piano
 Bill Evans — piano on disc four tracks 7-10
 Paul Chambers — bass
 Philly Joe Jones — drums

Production personnel
 Bob Weinstock — original producer
 Rudy Van Gelder — original engineer
 Joe Tarantino — digital remastering
 Greg Allen — reissue art direction
 Abbey Anna, Rikka Arnold, Bill Belmont, Chris Clough, Terri Hinte, Jamie Putnam — reissue project assembly
 Burt Goldblatt, Katherine Holzman Goldblatt, Michael Randolph, Don Schlitten, Chuck Stewart, Ted Williams — photography
 Stuart Kremsky, Cheryl Pawelski, Nick Phillips — reissue compilation
 Bob Blumenthal — reissue liner notes

References

Miles Davis compilation albums
2006 compilation albums